Lyginopteridaceae is an extinct family of plants (Pteridospermatophyta) in North America and European Carboniferous coal measures.

Description
Lyginopteridaceae were shrubs and vines with radiospermic ovules containing a lagenostome. They consisted of forms with monostelic stem petioles usually with single strand and small seeds. Family members include Lyginopteris and Heterangium.

References

External links

Pteridospermatophyta
Carboniferous plants
Prehistoric plant families
Carboniferous first appearances
Carboniferous extinctions